The 16th constituency of Bouches-du-Rhône is a French legislative constituency in Bouches-du-Rhône.

Deputies

Elections

2022

 
 
 
 
 
 
 
|-
| colspan="8" bgcolor="#E9E9E9"|
|-

2017

2012

|- style="background-color:#E9E9E9;text-align:center;"
! colspan="2" rowspan="2" style="text-align:left;" | Candidate
! rowspan="2" colspan="2" style="text-align:left;" | Party
! colspan="2" | 1st round
! colspan="2" | 2nd round
|- style="background-color:#E9E9E9;text-align:center;"
! width="75" | Votes
! width="30" | %
! width="75" | Votes
! width="30" | %
|-
| style="background-color:" |
| style="text-align:left;" | Michel Vauzelle
| style="text-align:left;" | Socialist Party
| PS
| 
| 38.40%
| 
| 51.29%
|-
| style="background-color:" |
| style="text-align:left;" | Valérie Laupies
| style="text-align:left;" | Front National
| FN
| 
| 28.98%
| 
| 48.71%
|-
| style="background-color:" |
| style="text-align:left;" | Roland Chassain
| style="text-align:left;" | Union for a Popular Movement
| UMP
| 
| 22.62%
| colspan="2" style="text-align:left;" |
|-
| style="background-color:" |
| style="text-align:left;" | Emmanuelle Bonhomme
| style="text-align:left;" | Left Front
| FG
| 
| 6.63%
| colspan="2" style="text-align:left;" |
|-
| style="background-color:" |
| style="text-align:left;" | Salim Djerari
| style="text-align:left;" | Europe Ecology – The Greens
| EELV
| 
| 2.36%
| colspan="2" style="text-align:left;" |
|-
| style="background-color:" |
| style="text-align:left;" | Guy Dubost
| style="text-align:left;" | Far Left
| EXG
| 
| 0.50%
| colspan="2" style="text-align:left;" |
|-
| style="background-color:" |
| style="text-align:left;" | Bernard Pignolo
| style="text-align:left;" | Ecologist
| ECO
| 
| 0.28%
| colspan="2" style="text-align:left;" |
|-
| style="background-color:" |
| style="text-align:left;" | Christian Regis
| style="text-align:left;" | Far Left
| EXG
| 
| 0.22%
| colspan="2" style="text-align:left;" |
|-
| style="background-color:" |
| style="text-align:left;" | Mireille Haas
| style="text-align:left;" | Far Right
| EXD
| 
| 0.00%
| colspan="2" style="text-align:left;" |
|-
| colspan="8" style="background-color:#E9E9E9;"|
|- style="font-weight:bold"
| colspan="4" style="text-align:left;" | Total
| 
| 100%
| 
| 100%
|-
| colspan="8" style="background-color:#E9E9E9;"|
|-
| colspan="4" style="text-align:left;" | Registered voters
| 
| style="background-color:#E9E9E9;"|
| 
| style="background-color:#E9E9E9;"|
|-
| colspan="4" style="text-align:left;" | Blank/Void ballots
| 
| 1.48%
| 
| 4.01%
|-
| colspan="4" style="text-align:left;" | Turnout
| 
| 59.16%
| 
| 61.48%
|-
| colspan="4" style="text-align:left;" | Abstentions
| 
| 40.84%
| 
| 38.52%
|-
| colspan="8" style="background-color:#E9E9E9;"|
|- style="font-weight:bold"
| colspan="6" style="text-align:left;" | Result
| colspan="2" style="background-color:" | PS HOLD
|}

2007

|- style="background-color:#E9E9E9;text-align:center;"
! colspan="2" rowspan="2" style="text-align:left;" | Candidate
! rowspan="2" colspan="2" style="text-align:left;" | Party
! colspan="2" | 1st round
! colspan="2" | 2nd round
|- style="background-color:#E9E9E9;text-align:center;"
! width="75" | Votes
! width="30" | %
! width="75" | Votes
! width="30" | %
|-
| style="background-color:" |
| style="text-align:left;" | Michel Vauzelle
| style="text-align:left;" | Socialist Party
| PS
| 
| 32.39%
| 
| 52.32%
|-
| style="background-color:" |
| style="text-align:left;" | Roland Chassain
| style="text-align:left;" | Union for a Popular Movement
| UMP
| 
| 39.41%
| 
| 47.68%
|-
| style="background-color:" |
| style="text-align:left;" | Jean-Marc Charrier
| style="text-align:left;" | Communist
| PCF
| 
| 7.21%
| colspan="2" style="text-align:left;" |
|-
| style="background-color:" |
| style="text-align:left;" | Viviane Ricard
| style="text-align:left;" | Front National
| FN
| 
| 6.63%
| colspan="2" style="text-align:left;" |
|-
| style="background-color:" |
| style="text-align:left;" | Gilles Ayme
| style="text-align:left;" | Democratic Movement
| MoDem
| 
| 4.62%
| colspan="2" style="text-align:left;" |
|-
| style="background-color:" |
| style="text-align:left;" | Bruno Leclerc
| style="text-align:left;" | Far Left
| EXG
| 
| 2.07%
| colspan="2" style="text-align:left;" |
|-
| style="background-color:" |
| style="text-align:left;" | Jean-Marie Scifo
| style="text-align:left;" | Hunting, Fishing, Nature, Traditions
| CPNT
| 
| 2.01%
| colspan="2" style="text-align:left;" |
|-
| style="background-color:" |
| style="text-align:left;" | Naïma Fettal
| style="text-align:left;" | The Greens
| VEC
| 
| 1.10%
| colspan="2" style="text-align:left;" |
|-
| style="background-color:" |
| style="text-align:left;" | Jean-Flora Nosibor
| style="text-align:left;" | Ecologist
| ECO
| 
| 0.88%
| colspan="2" style="text-align:left;" |
|-
| style="background-color:" |
| style="text-align:left;" | Michel Psychopoulos
| style="text-align:left;" | Movement for France
| MPF
| 
| 0.84%
| colspan="2" style="text-align:left;" |
|-
| style="background-color:" |
| style="text-align:left;" | Laurence Deleuze
| style="text-align:left;" | Far Left
| EXG
| 
| 0.64%
| colspan="2" style="text-align:left;" |
|-
| style="background-color:" |
| style="text-align:left;" | Jean-Noël Houssais
| style="text-align:left;" | Far Right
| EXD
| 
| 0.58%
| colspan="2" style="text-align:left;" |
|-
| style="background-color:" |
| style="text-align:left;" | Guy Dubost
| style="text-align:left;" | Far Left
| EXG
| 
| 0.53%
| colspan="2" style="text-align:left;" |
|-
| style="background-color:" |
| style="text-align:left;" | Andrée D'Agostino
| style="text-align:left;" | Ecologist
| ECO
| 
| 0.51%
| colspan="2" style="text-align:left;" |
|-
| style="background-color:" |
| style="text-align:left;" | Chantal Valette
| style="text-align:left;" | Independent
| DIV
| 
| 0.39%
| colspan="2" style="text-align:left;" |
|-
| style="background-color:" |
| style="text-align:left;" | Romain Bodo
| style="text-align:left;" | Miscellaneous Right
| DVD
| 
| 0.20%
| colspan="2" style="text-align:left;" |
|-
| colspan="8" style="background-color:#E9E9E9;"|
|- style="font-weight:bold"
| colspan="4" style="text-align:left;" | Total
| 
| 100%
| 
| 100%
|-
| colspan="8" style="background-color:#E9E9E9;"|
|-
| colspan="4" style="text-align:left;" | Registered voters
| 
| style="background-color:#E9E9E9;"|
| 
| style="background-color:#E9E9E9;"|
|-
| colspan="4" style="text-align:left;" | Blank/Void ballots
| 
| 1.65%
| 
| 2.94%
|-
| colspan="4" style="text-align:left;" | Turnout
| 
| 60.42%
| 
| 63.65%
|-
| colspan="4" style="text-align:left;" | Abstentions
| 
| 39.58%
| 
| 36.35%
|-
| colspan="8" style="background-color:#E9E9E9;"|
|- style="font-weight:bold"
| colspan="6" style="text-align:left;" | Result
| colspan="2" style="background-color:" | PS GAIN
|}

2002

 
 
 
 
 
|-
| colspan="8" bgcolor="#E9E9E9"|
|-

1997

 
 
 
 
 
 
 
|-
| colspan="8" bgcolor="#E9E9E9"|
|-

References

16